The name Five Pagoda/Stupa Temple refers to several temples in China that were constructed following the architectural design of a Diamond Throne Pagoda inspired by the Indian Mahabodhi Temple. Temples built according to this design are:

Zhenjue Temple in Beijing, the oldest temple of this style in China
Five Pagoda Temple in Hohhot, Inner Mongolia
Miaozhan Temple in Kunming, Yunnan Province 
Guanghui Temple in Zhengding,  Hebei Province

Pagodas in China
Vajrayana